Joëlle Rollo-Koster is a Professor of Medieval History in the University of Rhode Island's History Department. On December 6, 2016, she was knighted by the French government with the medal of Chevalier des Palmes académiques. In 2017-2018 she was a EURIAS Fellow at the Swedish Collegium for Advanced Study.

Education 
Joëlle Rollo-Koster received her undergraduate degree and master's degree in history from the University of Nice, France. She earned a PhD in History at SUNY Binghamton in 1992 where she was a student of Richard Trexler.

Selected publications

As author
Raiding Saint Peter: Empty Sees, Violence, and the Initiation of the Great Western Schism (1378), 2008, Brill, 
The People of Curial Avignon: A Critical Edition of the Liber Divisionis and the Matriculae of Notre Dame la Majour, 2009, Edwin Mellen Press, 
Avignon and Its Papacy, 1309–1417: Popes, Institutions, and Society, 2015, Rowman and Littlefield,  
The Great Western Schism, 1378–1417: Performing Legitimacy, Performing Unity, 2022, CUP,

As editor
Medieval and Early Modern Ritual: Formalized Behavior in Europe, China and Japan, 2002, Brill, 
(Co-edited, with Thomas M. Izbicki) A Companion to the Great Western Schism (1378-1417), 2009, Brill,  
(Co-edited, with Kathryn Reyerson) For the Salvation of my Soul: Women and Wills in Medieval and Early Modern France, 2012, Centre for French History and Culture of the University of St Andrews, 
Death in Medieval Europe: Death Scripted and Death Choreographed, Routledge, 2016,

Recognition

 2008 Adèle Mellen Prize for Distinguished Contribution to Scholarship 
 2016 The medal of Chevalier des Palmes académiques
 2018 URI: Recipient URI Foundation, Scholarly Excellence Award

References 

University of Rhode Island faculty
Living people
Chevaliers of the Ordre des Palmes Académiques
Year of birth missing (living people)